Arena Arctica is a hangar in Kiruna Airport for fixed-wing aircraft and events in Kiruna, Sweden. The arena hosted the Second chance round of Melodifestivalen 2008.

Other websites 
Official site

Arctia
Kiruna
Buildings and structures in Norrbotten County